Charlotte Alice Alter (January 16, 1871 – December 25, 1924) was an American actress on stage and in silent films.

Early life
Alter was born in La Crosse, Wisconsin on January 16, 1871, the daughter of Frederick Pernal Alter and Ida Alter (née Soplitt).

Career

Alter began acting in the American midwest by 1890, playing soubrette roles in touring companies managed by Henrietta Crosman, Joseph Jefferson, and Charles Frohman, in such shows as The Cricket on the Hearth, Beside the Bonnie Brier Bush, The Country Circus, Fifi, The Shadows of a Great City, The Girl I Left Behind Me, and Hearts are Trumps. On Broadway, she acted in To Have and to Hold (1901), The Vinegar Buyer (1903), The Trifler (1905) with Esme Beringer, Charley's Aunt (1906), and Excuse Me (1911) by Rupert Hughes. Of her work in Excuse Me, critic George Jean Nathan wrote that she was among "the best in a generally capable cast." 

She toured Australia and Great Britain in Mrs. Wiggs of the Cabbage Patch. In 1916 she was leading her own company in vaudeville.

Silent film appearances by Alter included roles in the film shorts Advertising for a Wife (1910) and An Arizona Romance (1910), and the feature films The Eternal City (1915) alongside Pauline Frederick and Thomas Holding, and The Lottery Man (1916) with Oliver Hardy and Thurlow Bergen.

Personal life
Alter married a fellow actor, Harry C. Bradley, in 1923. She died in Beechhurst, Queens, New York, in 1924 of pneumonitis. She was buried at Flushing Cemetery.

References

External links

 
 
 Photographs of Lottie Alter in the Billy Rose Theatre Collection Photograph File, New York Public Library Digital Collections.
 A photograph of Lottie Alter by Matzene, in the University of Washington Libraries.

1871 births
1924 deaths
20th-century American actresses
Vaudeville performers
People from La Crosse, Wisconsin
American film actresses
American stage actresses